Barbora Krejčíková was the defending champion, but chose not to participate.

Rebecca Šramková won the title, defeating Marta Kostyuk in the final, 6–1, 6–2.

Seeds

Draw

Finals

Top half

Bottom half

References

Main Draw

Bella Cup - Singles